La Gran Señora is the eleventh major label studio album by Regional Mexican singer Jenni Rivera, released on December 1, 2009, by Fonovisa Records. It has sold 112,000 copies in the United States as of November 2011. It was named the best-selling Regional Mexican Album of 2010 by Billboard.

La Gran Señora reached number two on the Billboard Top Latin Albums chart in the United States and number nine on the Mexican Albums Chart. Five singles were released from the album: "Ya Lo Sé", "Por Que No Le Calas", "Déjame Volver Contigo", "La Gran Señora", and "Amarga Navidad". Alex Henderson of Allmusic gave the album a positive review and said, "La Diva de la Banda has no problem excelling in a mariachi-oriented environment".

The album earned a Latin Grammy nomination for Best Ranchero Album at the 11th Annual Latin Grammy Awards in 2010. It also received a nomination at the 2010 Oye! Awards for Popular Album of the Year. A sold-out promotional tour led to the recording of the live album La Gran Señora en Vivo, Rivera's follow-up album.

Background 
Although Jenni Rivera's previous recordings mainly consisted of banda music, she had also performed mariachi music live on her concerts. Therefore, Rivera decided to record an album in mariachi to appeal its fan base.

Recording and covers 
The album was recorded between September and October 2009. It consists of twelve cover tracks originally performed by other singers, with the exception of the title track, which was composed by Rivera. The follow-up album La Gran Señora en Vivo was released on November 22, 2010, which contains a DVD of her performing the album live at the Nokia Theatre in Los Angeles, California.

The first track, "Yo Soy una Mujer", was first recorded by Cuban singer Maggie Carles on her album Canto Amo Sueno (1998). The second track, "Por Que No Le Calas", was first performed by Mexican band Los Invasores de Nuevo León on their album Amor Aventurero (2008). "Before the Next Teardrop Falls" was originally recorded by Duane Dee in 1968. Rivera also recorded a Spanish-language version of the song as "Estaré Contigo Cuando Triste Estés". "Déjame Volver Contigo" was first performed by Mexican singer Dulce on her album Heridas. "La Cara Bonita" was first performed by Mexican singer Mercedes Castro, on her album Que Todo Mexico Se Entere (2004). "Ya Lo Sé" was originally recorded by her brother Lupillo Rivera on his album El Tiro de Gracia (2008). "Ni Princesa Ni Esclava" was originally performed by American singer Vikki Carr on her album Simplemente Mujer (1985). "No Llega El Olvido" was originally recorded by Mexican band Cuisillos on their album Vive y Déjame Vivir (2008). "La Escalera", was originally recorded by Argentinian singer, Amanda Miguel, on her album, Rompecorazones (1992). The title track was composed by Rivera herself. "Amarga Navidad" was originally recorded by Mexican singer Amalia Mendoza, on her album La Tariácuri (1958).

Promotion 

To promote the album, Rivera launched a tour throughout Mexico and the United States. The tour proved to be a success. La Gran Señora and La Gran Señora en Vivo both garnered Latin Grammy nominations in the Regional Mexican category and went platinum in Mexico and the United States. Rivera performed "Ya Lo Sé" and "Porque No Le Calas" at the 11th Annual Latin Grammy Awards. She also performed "Ya Lo Sé" at the 2010 Lo Nuestro Awards.

Commercial reception 
In Mexico, the album peaked at number nine on the Top 100 Mexico albums chart. It was certified double platinum and gold by AMPROFON for shipping 150,000 copies in the country. In the United States, it peaked at number two on the Billboard Top Latin Albums and number one on the Billboard Regional Mexican Albums charts. The albums was certified platinum (Latin field) by the Recording Industry Association of America (RIAA) for shipments of 100,000 copies. La Gran Señora was the best-selling regional Mexican album of 2010 in the United States. The album has sold 112,000 copies in the United States as of November 2011.

Singles 
"Ya Lo Sé" was released as the lead single from the album on November 17, 2009. In the United States, the song peaked at number sixteen on the Billboard Hot Latin Songs chart and number seven on the Billboard Regional Mexican Songs chart. "Por Que No Le Calas" was the second single from the album, released on April 12, 2010. A music video was released for it, which was directed by Jose Serrano and filmed in Los Angeles, California. In the United States, it peaked at number forty-six on the Billboard Hot Latin Songs chart and number twenty-two on the Billboard Regional Mexican Songs chart. "Déjame Volver Contigo" was released as the third single from the album on September 23, 2010. In the United States, it peaked at number thirty-one on the Billboard Regional Mexican Songs chart. "Amarga Navidad" was the third single from the album, released in 2011. In the United States, the song peaked at number thirty-three in 2011 and number twenty-five in 2012 on the Billboard Regional Mexican Songs chart. "La Gran Señora" was the fourth and final single released from the album. In the United States, it peaked at number forty-four on the Billboard Hot Latin Songs chart and number twenty-three on the Billboard Regional Mexican Songs chart.

Critical reception 

Alex Henderson of AllMusic gave the album four out of five stars and said, "La Diva de la Banda has no problem excelling in a mariachi-oriented environment." Leila Cobo of Billboard magazine said, "Rivera,... went out on a limb on her first ranchera album and delivered a jewel." The album earned a Latin Grammy nomination for Best Ranchero Album at the 11th Annual Latin Grammy Awards in 2010, which went to Vicente Fernández for Necesito de Tí. It also received a nomination at the 2010 Oye! Awards for Popular Album of the Year, but lost to Alejandro Fernández for Dos Mundos: Evolución + Tradición. Rivera also received a nomination for Ranchero Artist of the Year.

Rivera was awarded Female Regional Mexican Artist of the Year at the 2010 Lo Nuestro Awards. At the 2010 Latin Billboard Music Awards, she was awarded Top Latin Albums Artist of the Year, Female and Regional Mexican Airplay Artist of the Year, Female.

Track listing

Chart performance

Weekly charts

Year-end charts

Certifications

References

2009 albums
Jenni Rivera albums
Fonovisa Records albums
Spanish-language albums